Stade Demba Diop is a multi-use stadium in greater Dakar, Senegal. It is situated on Boulevard Président Habib Bourguiba in Sicap-Liberté, an urban arrondissement of Dakar. Several football clubs use this stadium for their home games.

History
Built in 1963, the stadium was later named after Demba Diop, former mayor of M'bour and Minister of Youth and Sport under President Léopold Sédar Senghor. Diop was assassinated on 3 February 1967. In 2017, eight people died after a wall at the Stade Demba Diop collapsed during a match between Stade de Mbour and US Ouakam.

Facilities

The stadium holds 30,000 people and its current surface is synthetic turf.

Events
The stadium is currently used mostly for football matches and serves as a home ground of ASC Diaraf, AS Douanes, US Ouakam and ASC Xam Xam. It is also used for concerts, political gatherings, and Senegalese wrestling matches.

A mass stampede occurred in July 2017 in the stadium, leaving eight dead and 60 injured.

See also
ASC Xam Xam
Sport in Senegal
Stade Léopold Sédar Senghor

References  

This article is largely based on a translation of the French Wikipedia's  :fr:Stade Demba Diop.

External links

 Présentation sur le site du Ministère des Sports

Demba Diop
Sport in Dakar
Sports venues completed in 1963
ASC Jaraaf
AS Douanes (Senegal)